Miss Cultural Harvest Festival is a Malaysian ethnic beauty pageant held annually during the Sarawak Harvest and Folklore Festival since 1999.

Background
Miss Cultural Harvest Festival is held in conjunction with the Sarawak Harvest and Folklore Festival, one of the highlights of the Gawai Dayak celebration. The Sarawak Harvest and Folklore Festival is the largest in Sarawak in terms of the community involved.

The beauty pageant aims to seek a winner who has the grace and poise, articulate with a sound knowledge of Sarawak and its tourism-related subjects. The beauty pageant is open to all single ladies of any background, unlike the traditional Kumang Gawai pageant where the contestants are of the Dayak community.

Titleholders

Former editions
Due to change of the festival name and collaboration with Fair and Lovely brand, the contest was previously known as "Miss Fair and Lovely Gawai Tourism Night (GTN)" between 1999 and 2004, "Miss Fair and Lovely" for the 2005 and 2006 editions, "Miss Fair and Lovely World Harvest Festival" between 2007 and 2010, and "Miss World Harvest Festival" for the 2011 and 2012 editions.

Miss World Harvest Festival (2011 - 2012)

Miss Fair and Lovely World Harvest Festival (2007 - 2010)

Miss Fair and Lovely (2006)

Miss Fair and Lovely Gawai Tourism Night (GTN) (1999 - 2004)

Notable crossovers
Winners and contestants who competed/appeared at other international/ national beauty pageants:

International Pageants

Miss World
 2014 - Dewi Liana Seriestha (Top 25)

 National Pageants

Miss World Malaysia
 2011 - Janet Bennet (Top 10 and "Miss Photogenic")
 2014 - Dewi Liana Seriestha (Winner)
 2016 - Francisca Luhong James Bungan (3rd runner-up)
 2018 - Francisca Luhong James Bungan (Top 5)

Miss Universe Malaysia
 2013 - Karissa Kara Simon (Top 17 Finalist) 
 2018 - Jessy Gantle (Top 18 Finalist) 
2020 - Francisca Luhong James Bungan  (Winner)

Miss Earth Malaysia
 2017 - Jean Seymour Harry (Top 6 and "Miss Eco Beauty")

See also
 Sarawak
 Gawai Dayak
 Unduk Ngadau
 Teluwaih Jinih

References

External links
 

Sarawak
Beauty pageants in Malaysia